Escape (stylized as E5C4P3 on the album cover) is the seventh studio album by American rock band Journey, released on July 31, 1981 by Columbia Records. It topped the American Billboard 200 chart and features four hit Billboard Hot 100 singles – "Don't Stop Believin'" ( 9), "Who's Crying Now" (no. 4), "Still They Ride" (no. 19) and "Open Arms" (no. 2) – plus rock radio staple "Stone in Love". In July 2021, it was certified diamond by the RIAA, making it the band's most successful studio album and second most successful album overall behind Greatest Hits.

Background and writing
Escape was the band's first album with keyboardist Jonathan Cain, who replaced founding keyboardist Gregg Rolie after he left the band at the end of 1980. The album was co-produced by former Lynyrd Skynyrd sound technician Kevin Elson and one-time Queen engineer Mike Stone, who also engineered the album.

Reception and legacy

Mike DeGagne of AllMusic retrospectively awarded Escape four-and-a-half stars out of five, writing, "The songs are timeless, and as a whole, they have a way of rekindling the innocence of youthful romance and the rebelliousness of growing up, built from heartfelt songwriting and sturdy musicianship." Colin Larkin awarded the album four out of five stars in the 2002 edition of the Virgin Encyclopedia of Popular Music. Contemporary Rolling Stone reviews were less favorable. The first review of 1981 by Deborah Frost marked Journey as heavy metal posers and the music in the album as easily playable by any session musician. In the 2004 edition of their album guide, Rolling Stone awarded the album two-and-a-half stars out of five, which was nonetheless an improvement from Dave Marsh's one star rating in the 1983 edition of the publication.

In 1988, Kerrang! readers voted Escape the greatest AOR album of all time―Classic Rock expressed the same opinion in 2008. In 1989, Kerrang! ranked Escape number 32 in "The 100 Greatest Heavy Metal Albums of All Time". A 2000 Virgin poll saw the album voted the 24th greatest heavy metal/alternative rock album of all time. In 2001, Classic Rock ranked the album  22 in "The 100 Greatest Rock Albums of All Time". In 2006, the same publication included it in their "200 Greatest Albums of the 80s", as one of the twenty greatest albums of 1981. Q magazine ranked Escape 15th among its "Records it's OK to Love" in 2006.

Cash Box described "Still They Ride" as a "bluesy lament" with a "sad, almost mournful" vocal, "doleful acoustic piano work" and "crying guitar notes."  Billboard called "Still They Ride" a "soft, lyrical ballad" with similar "tone and style" to "Open Arms".

An Atari 2600 game based on the album, Journey Escape, was released in 1982.

Track listing

Personnel

Journey
Steve Perry – lead vocals, producer (tracks 12–14)
Neal Schon – lead guitar, backing vocals
Jonathan Cain – keyboards, rhythm guitar, backing vocals
Ross Valory – bass, backing vocals
Steve Smith – drums, percussion

Production
Mike Stone, Kevin Elson – producers, engineers, mixing
Wally Buck – assistant engineer
Bob Ludwig – original mastering, remastering
Brian Lee – remastering
Herbie Herbert – management
Jim Welch – photography, art direction
Stanley Mouse – illustrations

Charts
Escape was the fifth-highest selling album of 1981, just behind Bella Donna from Stevie Nicks.

Weekly charts

Year-end charts

Singles

Certifications

See also
 Billboard Year-End
 List of Billboard 200 number-one albums of 1981
 List of best-selling albums in the United States

References

Journey (band) albums
1981 albums
Grammy Hall of Fame Award recipients
Columbia Records albums
Albums produced by Mike Stone (record producer)
Albums produced by Kevin Elson